Gardens Oval is an Australian Football oval and cricket ground in Darwin, Northern Territory, Australia. It was the home of NT AFL prior to the opening of Marrara Oval. In the early 1980s the NTFL played games against AFL teams as preseason warm up games. These games were the brain child of Kevin Sheedy the coach of Essendon AFL. These games played on Australian day each year lead to many indigenous players recruited to the AFL such as Michael Long. It is currently home to the Waratah Football Club which plays in the Northern Territory Football League competition.

Australian rules football has been played on the ground since the 1950s the ground was being prepared as a purpose built venue for the sport as early as 1950 as a replacement for the ailing Darwin Oval.

Soccer and rugby league were regularly played on the Oval from 1953.

The first recorded cricket match on the ground came in 2002 when Northern Territory played Queensland Academy of Sport.  The ground held its only first-class match in 2006 when the touring Indians against New Zealand Whites.  In 2007, the ground played to four matches in the World Cricket League Division Three, a tournament for Associate members of the International Cricket Council. The ground also held five Women's One Day Internationals between Australia Women and New Zealand Women in 2007, as well as a single Women's Twenty20 International between the same sides as part of the same series.

References

External links

Gardens Oval at ESPNcricinfo
Gardens Oval at CricketArchive

2002 establishments in Australia
Sports venues completed in 2002
Cricket grounds in Australia
Sports venues in Darwin, Northern Territory